Julius Sumerauer (born 12 February 2001) is a cricketer who plays for Jersey. In May 2019, he was named in Jersey's squad for the 2019 T20 Inter-Insular Cup against Guernsey. He made his Twenty20 International (T20I) debut for Jersey against Guernsey on 31 May 2019. The same month, he was named in Jersey's squad for the Regional Finals of the 2018–19 ICC T20 World Cup Europe Qualifier tournament in Guernsey. He played in Jersey's third match of the Regional Finals, against Norway, on 16 June 2019.

In September 2019, he was named in Jersey's squad for the 2019 ICC T20 World Cup Qualifier tournament in the United Arab Emirates. In November 2019, he was named in Jersey's squad for the Cricket World Cup Challenge League B tournament in Oman. He made his List A debut, for Jersey against Uganda, on 2 December 2019.

In October 2021, Sumerauer was named in Jersey's T20I squad for the Regional Final of the 2021 ICC Men's T20 World Cup Europe Qualifier tournament. In June 2022, he was named in Jersey's squad for the 2022 Uganda Cricket World Cup Challenge League B tournament. On 21 June 2022, in Jersey's match against Italy, Sumerauer took his first five-wicket haul in List A cricket, with 6/32.

References

External links
 

2001 births
Living people
Jersey cricketers
Jersey Twenty20 International cricketers
Place of birth missing (living people)